U.S. Route 56 (US 56) is an east–west United States highway that runs for approximately  in the Midwestern United States. US 56's western terminus is at Interstate 25 Business (I-25 Bus.), US 412 and New Mexico State Road 21 (NM 21) in Springer, New Mexico and the highway's eastern terminus is at US 71 in Kansas City, Missouri. Much of it follows the Santa Fe Trail.

Route description
The highway passes through New Mexico, Oklahoma, Kansas, and Missouri. The eastbound shoulder also touches a corner of Texas at a small road junction near the New Mexico/Oklahoma border.

New Mexico
US 56 runs concurrent with US 412 for its entire length in New Mexico, and are signed as such through the state. The two routes begin in Springer and head east towards Abbot, where they serve as the northern terminus of State Road 39. Continuing east, US 56/412 meet the southern terminus of NM 193 south of Farley, the northern terminus of NM 120 east of Gladstone, and the southern terminus of NM 453. US 56/412 intersect US 64 and US 87 in Clayton, New Mexico, and US 64 joins with US 56/412 in their trek northeast. The three routes serve as the southern terminus of NM 406 as they enter the Kiowa National Grassland. The three routes then cross into Oklahoma together.

Oklahoma
US-56's short path through Oklahoma consists of a diagonal slice across the western part of the Oklahoma Panhandle. US-56/64/412 enter Oklahoma near the southwest corner of the Panhandle, where they also enter Rita Blanca National Grassland. They leave the grassland near Felt. Three miles (4.8 km) southwest of Boise City, US-385 joins the concurrency. The routes then enter Boise City, where they enter a traffic circle around the Cimarron County Courthouse that involves US-56, US-64, US-385, US-412, State Highway 3, and SH-325. After leaving the traffic circle, US-56 overlaps US-64, US-412, and SH-3.  east of the courthouse, US-56 meets US-287 at an interchange.

The route parallels the Cimarron Valley Railroad for the remainder of its time in Oklahoma. Keyes is the next town on US-56, and it also serves as the northern terminus of SH-171 where the two highways intersect. US-56 crosses into Texas County east of Sturgis. Just before crossing the Kansas line, US-56 meets the north end of SH-95. US-56 then enters Kansas on the east edge of Elkhart.

Kansas

US-56 enters the state at the Kansas/Oklahoma border near Elkhart. It weaves its way across the state from southwest to northeast, passing through such towns as Dodge City, Great Bend, McPherson, Council Grove, and Baldwin City. It joins with I-35/US-50 east of Gardner, and goes northeast with I-35 into the Kansas City Metro Area. It exits the state as part of Shawnee Mission Parkway in Merriam.

Missouri

For one mile (1.6 km) in Kansas City's Country Club Plaza, Route 56 follows the noted boulevard Ward Parkway along with 47th St through the Country Club Plaza.  The route ends at an intersection with U.S. Route 71. It also includes Blue Parkway and Swope Parkway at certain points.

History

In the early 1950s, towns along what was then the K-45 corridor, connecting Ellsworth, Kansas to the Oklahoma state line at Elkhart, formed the Mid-Continent Diagonal Highway Association to push for a new highway from Springer, New Mexico (on US 85) northeast across the Oklahoma Panhandle, along K-45, and continuing to Manitowoc, Wisconsin on Lake Michigan. By mid-1954, it was being promoted as U.S. Route 55 between the Great Lakes and the Southwestern United States. The first submissions to the American Association of State Highway Officials (AASHO) to establish the route were made in 1954; all placed the northeast end at Manitowoc, Wisconsin (absorbing US 151 from Cedar Rapids, Iowa), while they varied on whether the southwest end was to be at Albuquerque, New Mexico or Nogales, Arizona. The first route considered in northeast Kansas was via US 40 from Ellsworth to Topeka and K-4 and US 59 via Atchison to St. Joseph, Missouri. A revised route adopted in March 1955, due to AASHO objections to the original route, which traveled concurrently with other U.S. Highways for over half of its length, followed K-14, K-18, US 24, K-63, K-16, and US 59 via Lincoln and Manhattan. In July, the US 50-N Association proposed a plan that would have eliminated US 50N by routing US 55 along most of its length, from Larned east to Baldwin Junction, and then along US 59 to Lawrence and K-10 to Kansas City; towns on US 50N west of Larned, which would have been bypassed, led a successful fight against this.

However, in September of that year, the Kansas Highway Commission accepted that plan, taking US 55 east to Kansas City. On June 27, 1956, the AASHO Route Numbering Committee considered this refined plan for US 55, between Springer, New Mexico and Kansas City, Missouri, with a short US 155 along the remaining portion of US 50N from Larned west to Garden City. The committee approved the request, but since the proposed route was more east–west than north–south, it changed it to an even number – US 56 – and the spur to US 156.

On June 26, 1958, AASHO denied the New Mexico Department of Transportation's request to extend US 56 west from Springer to Santa Fe, which would have followed US 85, US 84 and US 285.

US 56 originally took a different route between Boise City, Oklahoma and Elkhart, Kansas. The original route followed US 64 east to an intersection south of Eva. It then split off to the north towards Elkhart. By 1961, the section north of US 64 had been overlaid with SH-95. The following year, US 56 was rerouted over SH-114, bringing it to its current diagonal path across the Oklahoma Panhandle. The old alignment is still on the Oklahoma highway system as the north half of SH-95.

Major intersections

Related routes

Herington business loop

U.S. Route 56 Business (US-56 Bus.) is a short business loop through Herington, Kansas. US-56 begins at US-56 and US-77 south of Herington. At this intersection, there is no access to eastbound US-56 or northbound US-77 from US-56 Bus. and no access to US-56 Bus. from westbound US-56 or southbound US-77. US-56 Bus. heads north through flat lands with scattered trees for  then enters Herington. The highway continues for roughly  then curves east and becomes Trapp Street. US-56 Bus. then crosses Lime Creek as it continues through the city. After roughly  the highway exits the city and reaches its eastern terminus at US-56 and US-77.

US-56 Bus. and US-77 Bus. was approved through Herington in a meeting on October 13, 1979. US-77 Bus. was approved to be decommissioned in a meeting on June 9, 1991, leaving just US-56 Bus..

Major intersections

Temporary route

U.S. Route 56 Temporary (US-56 Temp.) was a  temporary route of US 56 in Oklahoma. It began on modern US-56 northeast of Boise City, Oklahoma and followed US 64 and SH 3 east to SH 95. It then traveled north along SH 95 to Elkhart, Kansas. The route was approved on July 11, 1956, along existing highways, when the current routing of US-56 was being constructed. By 1962, US 56 was rerouted over SH 114, bringing it to its current diagonal path across the Oklahoma Panhandle.

Major intersections

References

External links
 Endpoints of U.S. Highway 56
 Kansas Highway Maps: Current, Historic, KDOT

 
56
56
56
56
56
Transportation in Colfax County, New Mexico
Transportation in Union County, New Mexico
Transportation in Cimarron County, Oklahoma
Transportation in Texas County, Oklahoma
Transportation in Morton County, Kansas
Transportation in Stevens County, Kansas
Transportation in Seward County, Kansas
Transportation in Haskell County, Kansas
Transportation in Gray County, Kansas
Transportation in Ford County, Kansas
Transportation in Edwards County, Kansas
Transportation in Pawnee County, Kansas
Transportation in Barton County, Kansas
Transportation in Rice County, Kansas
Transportation in McPherson County, Kansas
Transportation in Marion County, Kansas
Transportation in Dickinson County, Kansas
Transportation in Morris County, Kansas
Transportation in Lyon County, Kansas
Transportation in Osage County, Kansas
Transportation in Douglas County, Kansas
Transportation in Johnson County, Kansas
Transportation in Jackson County, Missouri